Fayyaz Butt (born 17 August 1993) is a Pakistani-born cricketer who plays for the Oman national cricket team. He made his List A debut for Oman in the 2018 ICC World Cricket League Division Two tournament on 8 February 2018. Prior to his List A debut he was named in Pakistan's squad for the 2010 Under-19 Cricket World Cup.

In August 2018, he was named in Oman's squad for the 2018 Asia Cup Qualifier tournament. In October 2018, he was named in Oman's squad for the 2018 ICC World Cricket League Division Three tournament.

In December 2018, he was named in Oman's team for the 2018 ACC Emerging Teams Asia Cup. In February 2019, he was named in Oman's Twenty20 International (T20I) squad for the 2018–19 Oman Quadrangular Series in Oman. He made his T20I debut for Oman against Ireland on 13 February 2019.

In March 2019, he was named in Oman's team for the 2019 ICC World Cricket League Division Two tournament in Namibia. Oman finished in the top four places in the tournament, therefore gaining One Day International (ODI) status. Butt made his ODI debut for Oman on 27 April 2019, against Namibia, in the tournament's final. He was the leading wicket-taker for Oman in the tournament, with 16 dismissals in six matches.

In September 2019, he was named in Oman's squad for the 2019 ICC T20 World Cup Qualifier tournament. In November 2019, he was named in Oman's squad for the 2019 ACC Emerging Teams Asia Cup in Bangladesh. In September 2021, he was named in Oman's squad for the 2021 ICC Men's T20 World Cup.

References

External links
 

1993 births
Living people
Cricketers from Sialkot
Omani cricketers
Oman One Day International cricketers
Oman Twenty20 International cricketers
Pakistani cricketers
Pakistani emigrants to Oman
Pakistani expatriates in Oman